This Can't Be Life is the second album by the American band Wild Colonials, released in 1996. The first single was "Charm", which was an alternative radio hit. The band supported the album with a North American tour that included stints with Los Lobos and Chalk FarM. They also played the 1997 Lilith Fair.

Production
The album was produced by Tony Berg and John Porter. The album cover used artwork from a lithograph from the 1700s, which was discovered on a postcard. Bandmember Scott Roewe played a penny whistle, melodica, and didgeridoo, among other instruments. Rickie Lee Jones contributed to the album. "Want" is about the death of singer Angela McCluskey's mother. McCluskey had a practice of starting to compose songs during year-end holiday seasons.

Critical reception

The Philadelphia Inquirer deemed the album a "catchy, Eastern-flavored second effort." The Los Angeles Times wrote that "McCluskey sings messages for the lovelorn and the bitter over sounds that run from jazzy torch epics to the vaguely Middle Eastern." The San Jose Mercury News noted the "same low-range vocal ground" as 10,000 Maniacs. The Arkansas Democrat-Gazette dismissed This Can't Be Life as "fuzzy acoustic vaguely Irish folk jazz."

The Orange County Register advised: "Imagine an Out of Time-era R.E.M. fronted by a raving mad Deborah Harry and you begin to get the idea of the punch Wild Colonials can pack." The Star-Ledger stated that "McCluskey's husky, intelligent, sultry voice is the right vehicle to carry the band's jagged, edgy, Celtic-flavored alternative folk-rock that's as much Roxy Music as it is 10,000 Maniacs."

The Oregonian listed This Can't Be Life among the 10 best albums of 1996.

Track listing
All songs written by the Wild Colonials
 "This Misery"  – 4:13
 "Spirit"  – 4:50
 "Coy" – 3:44
 "Wake Up Sad"  – 5:05
 "Charm"  – 3:17
 "Want" – 5:14
 "If"  – 4:05
 "Blue"  – 5:36
 "Different"  – 3:54
 "Childhood"  – 5:49

Personnel
Angela McCluskey - vocals
Shark - guitars, vocals, percussion, ambient bass
Paul Cantelon - violin, piano
Scott Roewe - bass, piano, organ, melodica, wurlitzer, casio, didgeridoo, bass clarinet, penny whistle, tenor sax
Thaddeus Corea - drums, percussion, vocals

With
Martin Tillmann - cello
Jon Brion - chamberlin, guitar, organ on "This Misery"
Juliet Prater - world percussion
Tony Berg - optigan, guitar, tambura
Andrew Scheps - mütes galore on "Wake Up Sad" and "This Misery"
Rickie Lee Jones - Guest vocals on "Spirit"
Eric Reigler - uilleann pipes on "Want"
Ethan James -  hurdy-gurdy on "Childhood"
Robert Burns - vibraphone on "Wake Up Sad"
Whitney Wade - additional vocals on "If"

Production
Producers: Tony Berg, John Porter
Mixers: Tchad Blake, Jim Rondinelli
Recorded by: Brian Scheuble, Joe McGrath
Additional engineering: Howard Willing

References

Wild Colonials albums
1996 albums
Geffen Records albums
Albums produced by Tony Berg